Frederick Charles Toomer (born 19 February 1992) is an English professional footballer who plays as a goalkeeper for Hong Kong Premier League club HKFC.

Club career

HKFC
On 5 February 2023, in a rather unorthodox fashion, Toomer managed to score his first goal in his career against Resources Capital with an overhead bicycle kick in the 90+6 minute to equalize the game to make the score 1–1 and give HKFC a hard-earned point.

Career statistics

Club

Notes

References

External links
 Yau Yee Football League profile
 Full-Time profile

Living people
1992 births
English footballers
Association football goalkeepers
National League (English football) players
Hong Kong First Division League players
Hong Kong Premier League players
Eastleigh F.C. players
Hong Kong FC players
English expatriate footballers
English expatriate sportspeople in Hong Kong
Expatriate footballers in Hong Kong
Romsey Town F.C. players
Alresford Town F.C. players
Bemerton Heath Harlequins F.C. players
Footballers from Southampton
Wessex Football League players